Camponotus sayi is a species of ant in the family Formicidae.

Subspecies
These two subspecies belong to the species Camponotus sayi:
 Camponotus sayi bicolor Pergande
 Camponotus sayi sayi

References

Further reading

External links

 

sayi
Articles created by Qbugbot
Insects described in 1893